Reyn Johnson (born 1 November 1990) is a Guamanian international footballer. He made his first appearance for the Guam national football team in 2008.

References

1990 births
Living people
Guamanian footballers
Guam Shipyard players
Guam international footballers
People from Tamuning, Guam
Association football midfielders
UMass–Boston Beacons men's soccer players